Sandrine Boëlle (née Bachy; born 26 May 1961) is a French politician from The Republicans. She has represented Paris's 14th constituency as an MP since 2020.

Early life 
Boëlle was born in Neuilly-sur-Seine.

Career 
Boëlle was the substitute for long term MP Claude Goasguen at the 2017 legislative election. When Goasguen died from a heart attack after contracting COVID-19, Boëlle took his place on the National Assembly.

References 

1961 births
Living people
People from Neuilly-sur-Seine
Women members of the National Assembly (France)
Deputies of the 15th National Assembly of the French Fifth Republic
The Republicans (France) politicians
Politicians from Île-de-France
Members of Parliament for Paris